The 1992 Brown Bears football team was an American football team that represented Brown University during the 1992 NCAA Division I-AA football season. Brown, winless, finished last in the Ivy League. 

In their third season under head coach Mickey Kwiatkowski, the Bears compiled an 0–10 record and were outscored 333 to 156. Brett Brown and Chris Gordon were the team captains. 

The Bears' winless (0–7) conference record placed last in the Ivy League standings. They were outscored 218 to 112 by Ivy opponents. 

Brown played its home games at Brown Stadium in Providence, Rhode Island.

Schedule

References

College football winless seasons
Brown
Brown Bears football seasons
Brown Bears football